Yarimar Rosa (born June 20, 1988) is a Puerto Rican volleyball player.

She is a member of the Puerto Rico women's national volleyball team and played for Indias de Mayagüez in 2014. She was part of the Puerto Rican national team at the 2014 FIVB Volleyball Women's World Championship in Italy, and at the 2015 FIVB World Grand Prix.

Clubs
  Indias de Mayagüez (2014)

References

1988 births
Living people
People from Vega Baja, Puerto Rico
Puerto Rican women's volleyball players
Volleyball players at the 2015 Pan American Games
Pan American Games competitors for Puerto Rico
Volleyball players at the 2016 Summer Olympics
Wing spikers
Summer Olympics competitors for Puerto Rico